Qareh Chal (also Romanized as Qareh Chāl) is a village in Gavdul-e Markazi Rural District, in the Central District of Malekan County, East Azerbaijan Province, Iran. At the 2006 census, its population was 2,234, in 517 families.

References 

Populated places in Malekan County